The Onion Lake Cree Nation is a Plains Cree First Nations band government in Canada, straddling the Alberta/Saskatchewan provincial border approximately  north of the City of Lloydminster.

It is within Alberta's County of Vermilion River and Saskatchewan's Rural Municipality of Frenchman Butte No. 501 at the intersection of Highway 17 and Alberta Highway 641/Saskatchewan Highway 797.

The Makaoo 120 reserve is located within both provinces while the Seekaskootch 119 reserve is wholly within Saskatchewan. Both reserves once maintained separate band governments, combining to form Onion Lake in 1914.

The Onion Lake Cree Nation has five schools within the community: Sakāskohc High School, Eagleview Middle School, Chief Taylor Elementary School, Pewasenakwan Primary School, and Kihēw Waciston Cree Immersion School. A widely seen First World War propaganda poster shows Moo-Che-We-In-Es of the Onion Lake Cree Nation making a $1.50 donation to the Canadian Patriotic Fund with a cover letter in Western Cree syllabics.

Etymology 

Onion Lake is a translation of Wicekikaskosîwi-sâkahikan, "Wild Onion" smelly plant, a nearby body of water where the plant was abundant. When referring to the community today, though, Cree speakers typically use wîhcekaskosîwi-sâkahikanihk, "[domestic] onion lake".

Onion Lake, Saskatchewan 
The unincorporated area of Onion Lake is located within the Saskatchewan portion of the Onion Lake Cree Nation at the intersection of Highway 17 and Alberta Highway 641/Saskatchewan Highway 797.

References

External links 

County of Vermilion River
Frenchman Butte No. 501, Saskatchewan
First Nations governments in Saskatchewan
Cree governments